ESTOILE NAIANT is the first studio album by the electronic artist patten. It was released in 2014 by Warp Records. The album follows the 2013 EP EOLIAN INSTATE and is the first patten LP since the 2011 record GLAQJO XAACSSO, released by No Pain in Pop.

Track listing

References

Warp (record label) albums
2014 albums